Ulcumayo (from local Quechua Ullqu Mayu or Ullqumayu, "male river") is one of four districts of the Junín Province in Peru.

Geography 
Other mountains are listed below:

The Ullqu Mayu is the most important river of the district.

References